Tsibeyevo is a rural locality (a selo) in Novoalexandrovskoye Rural Settlement, Suzdalsky District, Vladimir Oblast, Russia. The population was 480 as of 2010. There are 9 streets.

Geography 
Tsibeyevo is located 20 km southwest of Suzdal (the district's administrative centre) by road. Gubachevo is the nearest rural locality.

References 

Rural localities in Suzdalsky District
Suzdalsky Uyezd